In some countries which have a five-day workweek with Saturday and Sunday being days off, on some occasions some Saturdays may be declared working Saturdays.

Subbotnik
In the former Soviet Union, subbotniks were days of voluntary unpaid labor.

Transferred working day
In the Soviet Union, modern Russia, and Hungary, the Friday following a public holiday that falls on Thursday and the Monday before one that falls on Tuesday are transferred to Saturdays to make longer runs of consecutive nonworking days. In this case the "bridge" Monday or Friday is treated as a Saturday in terms of time tables and working hours and the related "working Saturday" is treated as a normal work day. Over the two work weeks concerned, work is done on nine days with one work week running for six days and the other one for three. Employees always have the option of taking a day from their personal vacation allowance and using it to avoid working on the "working Saturday". Some employers and many education institutions treat the working Saturday as a regular one (giving a "free" day off in the former case).

For example in 2007 Russia held working Sundays on 28 April, 9 June, and 29 December in lieu of 30 April, 11 June, and 31 December, respectively.

This practice requires work on Saturday which is forbidden in Jewish law (Shabbat). For this reason, Jews are sometimes offered the alternative of taking the "Working Saturday" off as an unpaid day. In reality the working Saturday is a day of low productivity due to a tired and resentful workforce. Thus it is often used for corporate team building activities and people often go home in the mid-afternoon. A number of shops follow their usual Saturday opening hours, closing early or not at all opening.

Romania
In Romania, there was a six-day workweek until 1990. Initially there were an average of 48 working hours a week, but in 1982 and 1985 the communist government formally reduced the working hours to 46, and subsequently 45. In some areas a reduced workweek (săptămână redusă de lucru) was permitted, involving 1-2 extra work hours from Monday to Friday in exchange for a free Saturday, but this was only about flexibility of working program, not a real process of switching to a 5-day workweek. Unions in Romania were not independent, but obeyed the Communist Party, so they were not interested in fighting for workers rights. More than that, the censorship banned any information about the 5-day workweek (even this measure was implemented in USSR since 1967).

The process of transition to 5-day workweek started on 19 March 1990 with 2 free days a month, usually Saturdays. The same law stated that the term for finalizing the transition is the end of 3rd trimester (i.e. 30 September 1990).

See also
 Action Z
 Global Youth Service Day
 International Volunteer Day
 International Year of Volunteers
 Join Hands Day
 Mandela Day
 MLK Day of service
 Mitzvah Day
 Random Acts of Kindness Day
 Sewa Day
 Make A Difference Day
 World Kindness Day

References

Working time
Saturday events